Eduard Zuckmayer (3 August 1890 – 2 July 1972) was a German music educator, composer, conductor and pianist. He was the older brother of the famous German writer Carl Zuckmayer (1896–1977).

Family and Youth 
He was the first son of wealthy factory owner Carl Zuckmayer (1864–1947) who produced tamper-evident lids for wine bottles in Nackenheim, a wine-growing village on the Rhine front. The parents of his mother, Amalie Zuckmayer (1869–1954, née Goldschmidt), were converted from Judaism to Protestantism whereas he was raised as a Catholic. 

From the age of six, he got piano lessons. His talent was recognised early. At the age of twelve, he started to compose. However, he started to study jurisprudence but soon quit. In 1909 he took private piano lessons from Robert Kahn (1865–1951) and James Kwast (1852–1927) in Berlin. He also attended the conductor's school of Fritz Steinbach (1855–1916) and became a piano pupil of Lazzaro Uzielli (1861–1943) at Conservatory in Cologne. In 1914, he got concert level as pianist and conductor.

Work

Germany 
In 1915 he was a conductor at City theatre in Mainz. He and his younger brother volunteered as soldiers in World War I. He was severely wounded and decorated twice with the Iron Cross 2nd class and later with the Iron Cross 1st class. Between 1919 and 1925 he lived in Frankfurt where he performed Paul Hindemith's Sonata in D for violin and piano op. 11, No. 2. He worked as a music teacher, conductor, and pianist. From 1923 to 1925 he also led a piano class at Mainz Conservatory. At that time he was regarded as a brilliant concert pianist with a high chance for a marvellous career. But as an enthusiast of German  (= Youth Music Movement) he wanted to participate in the education of a new generation as a countermovement to the tattered political situation at Weimar Republic. He wanted music to be a part of many people's life. In contrary to middle-class culture  enhanced the status of amateur music.

There he founded the school's choir and its orchestra which included all pupils. In this progressive school sports, music and community theatre were elementary. Musical education was regarded as bridging between the fine arts and life. With his pupils Zuckmayer went on several tours through Germany and got very positive reviews in contemporary newspapers. For one of his compositions his brother Carl visited the school to write the lyrics. Other lyrics were created by Luserke. When Nazism was brought to power in January 1933 the school's work became much more difficult since it counted about one third Jewish pupils and teachers. Due to Antisemitism and "Gleichschaltung" (= Nazification) the school closed in spring 1934. Zuckmayer changed to Odenwaldschule, another progressive boarding school in Hesse. "Racial reasons" were mentioned when he became thrown out of Reichsmusikkammer (RMK) in 1935.

Turkey 
He had to leave Germany in 1936 and migrated to Turkey, where Paul Hindemith (1895–1963) was already busy reforming the Turkish music education, assigned by the Turkish president Kemal Atatürk. Hindemith mediated Zuckmayer's employment at the newly founded Music Conservatory of Ankara. There he met German colleagues like stage director Carl Ebert (1887–1980), conductor Ernst Praetorius (1880–1946), violinist Licco Amar (1891–1959) and many others from German music and theatre who were forced to flee from Nazism. Initially he led the pupils' orchestra of Musiki Muallim Mektebi, where music teachers were trained. But in autumn of 1936 he got appointed as chorus leader of the drama play and opera division. He also became pianist of the Ankara symphony orchestra conducted by Praetorius and was deputy of Hindemith. In 1938 Gisela Jockisch (1905–1985), née Günther, followed him with her little daughter Melanie to Turkey. She was the wife of pedagogue Walter Jockisch (1907–1970). Gisela Jockisch and Eduard Zuckmayer lived together in Turkey but were not able to marry before 1947 because German authorities in 1938 neglected a certificate of no impediment to marriage due to racist Nuremberg Laws.

In 1938, the music branch of the teacher's college Gazi Eğitim Enstitüsü (Gazi Institute for Education) was founded. Zuckmayer became its director of the music division which he held until 1970. He gave distinction to the Turkish music pedagogy. Until 1970 he trained nearly all Turkish music teachers (about 600 in total) who later taught throughout the country. He integrated fundamentals of the German  into Turkish music pedagogy. One of his later well-known pupils was conductor Hikmet Şimşek.

In 1940 his brother Carl wanted to help his brother to follow him to the United States with an affidavit of support where he already had migrated. He was worried about his safety since German troops were fighting in close range to Turkey in Greece as well as in southern regions of the Soviet Union. He contacted Hindemith in that matter.

In 1944 all German migrants were called upon by the Turkish government to leave Turkey. Eduard Zuckmayer refused ad got detained in Kırşehir detainment camp in Anatolia. Even there he very soon established a choir with whom he performed a mass by Giovanni Pierluigi da Palestrina at Pentecost 1945. Hindemith who meanwhile had migrated to the US tried to intervene against Zuckmayer's detainment. He sent a telegram to Turkish president İsmet İnönü but it was not successful. After the end of World War II Zuckmayer was able to leave the detainment camp and was reinstated to his former positions. He also taught music theory at Ankara Conservatory. Former Daimler-Benz chairman Edzard Reuter who lived in Turkey at that time described Zuckmayer as a "dignified and quiet man" who extinguished a "unique atmosphere" when he "sat down to play the piano".

In 1947 he was finally able to marry his partner Gisela Jockisch. But in 1950 she left Turkey with his adopted daughter Michaela to remigrate to Germany. Later both migrated to the United States. Zuckmayer instead stayed at his place of activity. Even in old age he performed as concert pianist and conductor in Ankara, Istanbul and Izmir. He had internalised the Turkish language as rarely another migrant. Since his entry to Turkey he had pled for translation of German folk songs to Turkish language. Meanwhile, they were integrated into Turkish music schoolbooks. He also transmitted Turkish folk tunes to polyphonic choral singing.

In contrary to Germany where he is shadowed by his famous younger brother Eduard Zuckmayer still is a very prominent figure in Turkey. He is one of the most prominent protagonists of Turkish music history of the 20th century, especially in its national music education. On the occasion of his 20th obit in 1992 a conference was held in Ankara where some of his works were performed. Zuckmayer died in the age of 81. His grave is in Ankara, Turkey.

Awards and distinctions 
 1914 – Wüllner Award, Cologne, Germany
 WWI – Iron Cross 2nd class, Iron Cross 1st class

Literature 
 Songül Demren: „…und ich danke Gott, bei den Türken zu sein!“. Eduard Zuckmayer in Ankara, in: Zuckmayer-Jahrbuch, Vol. 3, Wallstein Verlag, Göttingen 2000, pp. 481–504.
 Sabine Hillebrecht (Ed.): Haymatloz. Exil in der Türkei 1933–1945. Exhibition of Verein Aktives Museum and Goethe Institute with Akademy of Arts, 8 January to 20 February 2000, (= Schriftenreihe des Vereins Aktives Museum, Vol. 8), Verein Aktives Museum, Berlin 2000.
 Burcu Dogramaci: Eduard Zuckmayer, in Maurer Zenck, Claudia und Petersen, Peter (Ed.): Lexikon verfolgter Musiker und Musikerinnen der NS-Zeit. LexM. Universität Hamburg, Musikwissenschaftliches Institut, Hamburg 2007

External links 

 Eduard Zuckmayer – Ein Musiker in der Türkei. Südwestrundfunk, 2:41 min., 2017 (in German and Turkish)

References 

1890 births
People of the German Empire
German people of Jewish descent
People of the Weimar Republic
Musicians from Rhineland-Palatinate
German composers
20th-century German musicians
German Army personnel of World War I
German expatriates in Turkey
Academic staff of Gazi Eğitim Enstitüsü
1972 deaths